Kirt Hector (3 January 1972 – 19 April 2013), was a Dominica professional football manager.

Since August 2010 until April 2013 he is a head coach of the Dominica national football team.
He lost his life in a road collision in Pond Casse in the early hours of 19 April 2013.  With him were Dominican international footballers Norran Jno Hope and Joslyn Prince, only Prince survived.  The trio were travelling to the airport to head to St. Vincent where they would participate in the 2013 Windward Islands Tournament.

References

External links

Profile at Soccerpunter.com

1972 births
2013 deaths
Dominica football managers
Dominica national football team managers